Jürgen Ponto (17 December 1923 Bad Nauheim, Hesse - 30 July 1977 Frankfurt am Main) was a German banker and since 1969 chairman of the Dresdner Bank board of directors. Previously, he had worked as a lawyer. He was murdered by members of the Red Army Faction in events leading up to the German Autumn. Actor Erich Ponto was his uncle.

Death
On Saturday 30 July 1977, Ponto and his wife Ignes were at their Oberursel villa packing for a vacation in Rio de Janeiro, but were also expecting a visit from Susanne Albrecht, the daughter of a good friend of the Pontos. They didn't know that Susanne belonged to the RAF and had gone underground some weeks before. She arrived at around 17:10 with two strangers, later identified as Brigitte Mohnhaupt and Christian Klar. Albrecht gave Ignes a bouquet of red roses, and all the guests were invited into the living room, where Ignes left them alone with Ponto.

From the living room, raised voices were heard and then gunshots. It is thought that Albrecht and her accomplices attempted to kidnap Ponto, and after he resisted they shot him. He was shot five times and later died in a hospital in Frankfurt of his wounds. The three killers fled the villa, and escaped with their getaway driver Peter-Jürgen Boock. The killers took responsibility for the murder in the name of Roter Morgen (Red Morning).

See also

German Autumn
Red Army Faction

References

1923 births
1977 deaths
People from Bad Nauheim
People from the People's State of Hesse
German Army personnel of World War II
German bankers
Deaths by firearm in Germany
German murder victims
People murdered in Germany
Victims of the Red Army Faction
Assassinated German people
Terrorist incidents in Germany in 1977
1977 crimes in Germany
Dresdner Bank
People educated at the Wilhelm-Gymnasium (Hamburg)